Patrick Garraway (21 November 1883 – 2 August 1945) was a Guyanese cricketer. He played in two first-class matches for British Guiana in 1905/06 and 1907/08.

See also
 List of Guyanese representative cricketers

References

External links
 

1883 births
1945 deaths
Guyanese cricketers
Guyana cricketers